Aboulker is a Jewish surname, historically mainly existing in Algiers.

The Aboulker family of Algiers originated in Spain. The name appears for the first time in the twelfth century as Ibn Pulguer in Toledo. The family left Spain after the Alhambra Decree, that expelled Jews from Spain in 1492, and settled in Algiers.

In Arabic, Abū ʾl-Khayr is a kunya (nickname) meaning « the father of the good », or a generous, fortunate man. In Portuguese, it morphed into Abulquerque.

In French, it became Aboulker. Over the centuries the family included numerous scholars, rabbis and grand rabbis, merchants, and physicians. A street in Algiers was named 'Rue du Dr Charles Aboulker', a doctor to the poor.

Notable people with the surname include:

Berthe Bénichou-Aboulker (1888–1942), French Algerian poet and playwright
Colette Béatrice Aboulker-Muscat (1909–2003) French Algerian resistance fighter, teacher, and kabbalist
Isabelle Aboulker (born 1938), French composer
José Aboulker (1920–2009), French Algerian resistance fighter and politician
Marcel Aboulker (1905–1952), French screenwriter and film director.
Pierre Aboulker (1906–1976), Professor of medicine, surgeon 

Maghrebi Jewish surnames
Surnames of Algerian origin